Hubbardsville is a hamlet within the town of Hamilton, Madison County, New York, United States. Hubbardsville has a post office with ZIP code 13355.

Notable People from Hubbardsville 
 Welcome Chapman - Utah pioneer, stone cutter and early leader in the LDS Church.

References

Hamlets in Madison County, New York
Hamlets in New York (state)